Love in Our Time is a 1968 British film documentary about sex. It was directed and narrated by Elkan Allan.

References

External links
Love in Our Time at IMDb
 
The theme song to the film "Love In Our Time" was sung by Glo Macari.

British documentary films